This is a list of Association football games played by the Denmark national football team between 1980 and 1989. During the 1980s, the Danish national team played 115 games, winning 56, drawing 22, and losing 37. In these games, they scored 187 goals, while conceding 119 to their opponents. The first game of the 1980s was the May 7, 1980, game against Sweden, the 422nd overall Danish national team game. The last game of the 1980s was the November 15, 1989, game against Romania, the 536th game of the Danish national team.

Key
EC – European Championship match
ECQ – European Championship Qualifying match
F – Friendly match
NC - Nordic Football Championship match
OGQ - Olympic Games Qualifying match
OT - Other tournament(s)
WC – World Cup match
WCQ – World Cup Qualifying match

Games
Note that scores are written Denmark first

See also
List of Denmark national football team results
Denmark national football team statistics

Sources
Landsholdsdatabasen  at Danish Football Association
A-LANDSKAMPE - 1980 - 1989 at Haslund.info

1980s
1980 in Danish football
1981 in Danish football
1982 in Danish football
1983 in Danish football
1984 in Danish football
1985 in Danish football
1986 in Danish football
1987 in Danish football
1988 in Danish football
1989 in Danish football